Govardhan (fl. 1595–1640) was a noted Indian painter of the Mughal school of painting. His father Bhavani Das, had been a minor painter in the imperial workshop. Like many other Mughal painters, they were Hindus. He joined the imperial service during the reign of Akbar and he continued his work till the reign of Shah Jahan. The examples of his work survived till date show that he was fond of rich, sensuous colour and softly modeled forms.

Govardhan was one of the illustrators of the Baburnama currently located in the British Museum, London. The Jahangir celebrating the festival of Ab-Pashi (1615), presently kept in the Raza Library in Rampur, India is one of his significant creations. The portraits created by him in the Jahangir albums are presently in the collections of various American and European museums. He depicted the different human physiques of the Indians with much accuracy. An excellent portrait of him was prepared by one of his contemporary painter, Daulat.

Gallery

References

Sources

Further reading

 (see index: p. 148-152; plate 22)
The Emperors' album: images of Mughal India, an exhibition catalog from The Metropolitan Museum of Art (fully available online as PDF), which contains material on Govardhan
Govardhan was famed for his bird and animal paintings.

Mughal painters
17th-century Indian painters
Year of death unknown
Year of birth unknown
Indian portrait painters
Indian male painters